2019 Gold Cup may refer to one of the following: 

2019 CONCACAF Gold Cup, the men's continental championship for CONCACAF in association football
2019 Gold Cup (rugby union), an annual rugby union competition held between top non-university club teams of the South African Rugby Union's constituent provincial unions